Bank of Beirut and the Arab Countries s.a.l (not to be confused with Bank of Beirut) is a Lebanese commercial bank that was established in 1956. With its headquarters located in Clemenceau, Beirut, it is among the top ten banks in Lebanon, with a total capital of 157 billion LBP. It provides a wide range of services to individuals and corporations, including private banking, corporate and commercial banking, trade finance, retail banking, treasury and capital markets, and bank assurance.

These has 39 branches in Lebanon and 5 abroad in Cyprus, Iraq and representative offices the UAE, and Nigeria.

Background 
In 1956, three businessmen Tawfiq Assaf, Nach'at Sheikh Al-Ard and Jamal Shhaibir, decided to establish the bank its in Beirut, licensed by the Banque du Liban. Ghassan Assaf, continued his father Tawfiq Assaf's mission as its current Chairman upon his passing away.

In 1986, the bank opened its first branch in Cyprus.

In 2001, Bank of Beirut and the Arab Countries acquired 80% of the shares of Capital Insurance and Reinsurance, which allowed the bank to expand its services

In 2006, the bank’s capital was raised to 77 billion Lebanese pounds, with the issuance of preferential shares worth 50 million dollars. The process was repeated (80 million dollars) in 2012, raising his capital to 157 billion Lebanese pounds.

The bank ranks tenth in Lebanon in terms of assets, with 12,247 billion Lebanese pounds in 2018 compared to 10,444 billion pounds in 2017, an increase of 17.26%.

In 2017, the bank's net profits reached 74 billion Lebanese pounds, with a liquidity rate of 79.77% and a capital efficiency of 14.75%, which is higher than the requirements of the local supervisory authorities and international standards. This allows the bank to face the future with confidence.

Shareholders 
Today, the shareholders are as follows: The Assaf family 54.45%, Fransabank 37.07%, and minority shareholders 8.48%.

Key People 

 Sheikh Ghassan Assaf, Chairman.

See also 

 List of Banks in Lebanon
 Banque du Liban
 Bank Audi
 Byblos Bank
 Fransabank
 Economy of Lebanon

External links 

 https://www.bbacbank.com

References 

Banks of Lebanon
1956 establishments in Lebanon
Companies based in Beirut